In American radio, film, television, and video games, walla is a sound effect imitating the murmur of a crowd in the background. A group of actors brought together in the post-production stage of film production to create this murmur is known as a walla group. According to one story, walla received its name during the early days of radio, when it was discovered that having several people repeat the sound walla in the background was sufficient to mimic the indistinct chatter of a crowd. Nowadays, walla actors make use of real words and conversations, often improvised, tailored to the languages, speech patterns, and accents that might be expected of the crowd to be mimicked.

Other phrases are "peas and carrots", "watermelon cantaloupe" and "natter natter" (to which the response is "grommish grommish").

Parodies
Walla is sometimes turned into an in-joke. On the UK absurdist comedy radio series The Goon Show, Spike Milligan would distinctly mutter "rhubarb, rhubarb" during crowd scenes. Spinning off from this recurring joke, the British comedian Eric Sykes (a collaborator and friend of the Goons) wrote, directed and starred in the 1969 film Rhubarb, in which all of the actors' dialogue consists of the word "rhubarb" repeated over and over. This gives the finished movie the general feeling of a silent film because it has no coherent dialogue, but with the crucial difference that the "rhubarb" dialogue still conveys the characters' emotions and moods.

Similarly, the TV show South Park often parodies walla by having angry mobs mutter "rabble rabble rabble", and "peas and carrots". In an episode of Harvey Birdman Attorney at Law, a distraught courtroom audience distinctly and repeatedly shouts "rutabaga", a reference to the use of the term "rhubarb". In the Steve Martin film The Man With Two Brains, the audience at a scientific presentation is quite clearly heard to be saying "murmur, murmur" after Martin's character invites them to "murmur all you want". French and Saunders often make use of the phrase clearly and distinctly during sketches that feature film shoot extras. In the film Blazing Saddles, Mel Brooks's character urges attendees at a meeting to "harrumph", to the point of singling out a man who did not say it.

While it is generally expensive for the film makers to put distinct words in a specific background performer's mouth (as this would turn "extras" into actors during the sound mix, meaning they must be paid more), this problem can be avoided by recording gibberish that syncs with the on-screen mouth movements ("lip flap") of a specific background performer. It is thereby possible to make it sound as though an extra is saying something, when in fact they are not delivering any actual dialogue. This gibberish is known as "Snazzum", referring to the way in which the cartoon character Yosemite Sam would swear when angry ("Yassin Sassin Snazzum Frazzum!").

In Kung Pow! Enter the Fist a group of children in the background are heard exclaiming "Children! We're children" repeatedly.

In season 5, episode 3 ("Let's Stay Together") of 30 Rock, Rob Reiner loudly and clearly repeats the phrase, "Rhubarb, Rhubarb, Peas and Carrots..." in a scene when a group of congressmen and women are muttering indistinct chatter. A similar reference is made by Jack Donaghy's assistant, Jonathan, in Season 4, Episode 14 ("Future Husband").

In season 2, episode 3 ("Potato") of Blackadder, Captain Redbeard Rum (played by Tom Baker) can be heard saying "rhubarb, rhubarb!" in a scene involving four of the characters talking over each other.

In season 9, episode 8 ("Two Days Before the Day After Tomorrow") of South Park, congressmen can be clearly heard saying "peas and carrots", in sync with each other.

In season 5, episode 20 ("Leo Unwrapped") of Will & Grace, characters Karen Walker and Jack McFarland clearly say "hubub hubub" and "peas and carrots" in a joke reference.

In the Anthony Newley–Leslie Bricusse 1961 musical Stop the World – I Want to Get Off, the main character, Littlechap, is campaigning for elective office as a member of the Opportunist Party and makes speeches, all of which start with "Mumbo Jumbo". The initial lyrics, which are constantly revised, start with: "Mumbo Jumbo, rhubarb rhubarb / Tickety bubarb yak yak yak / Mumbo jum red white and bluebarb / Poor Brittania's on her back."

References

External links
 Walla description from filmsound.org
 Using Walla Walla Crowd Sounds in Radio Drama
 Dictionary definition from dictionary.com

Sound production
Cinematic techniques
Sound effects